Kulikov is a rural locality (a settlement) in Savinskoye Rural Settlement, Pallasovsky District, Volgograd Oblast, Russia. The population was 84 as of 2010. There are 3 streets.

Geography 
Kulikov is located in steppe, 34 km east of Pallasovka (the district's administrative centre) by road. Borsy is the nearest rural locality.

References 

Rural localities in Pallasovsky District